Moisés Espírito Santo (also Moisés Espírito Santo Bagagem) (born 20 May 1934 in Batalha, Portugal) is a Portuguese ethnologist and sociologist well known for his work on Ethnology of Religion, summarized in the books The Portuguese Popular Religion (1990) and Oriental Origins of the Portuguese Popular Religion (1988).
From 1973, Moisés Espírito Santo studied rural sociology and sociology of religion  at the École des Hautes Études en Sciences Sociales, in Paris, where he obtained M.A. and Ph.D. degrees in 1976 and 1979, respectively.
Moisés Espírito Santo is, now, retired professor at the New University of Lisbon and  guest professor at the Universidade Lusófona, in Portugal.

Bibliography
The Portuguese Popular Religion, Lisbon, Assírio & Alvim, 1990.
Oriental Origins of the Portuguese Popular Religion, Lisbon, Assírio & Alvim, 1988.

External links
Department de Sociology - FCSH - UNL
ISER - New University of Lisbon
IM - New University of Lisbon
Fórum Sociológico

1934 births
Living people
People from Leiria District
Portuguese ethnologists
Portuguese sociologists